Bernard Homola (26 October 1894 – 13 June 1975) was a German film score composer.

Selected filmography
 Strauss Is Playing Today (1928)
 The Carousel of Death  (1928)
 The Lady from Argentina (1928)
 Autumn on the Rhine (1928)
 A Girl with Temperament (1928)
 A Modern Casonova (1928)
 Tempo! Tempo! (1929)
 The Youths (1929)
 I Lost My Heart on a Bus (1929)
 Hungarian Nights (1929)
 Dawn (1929)
The Citadel of Warsaw (1930)
 Rag Ball (1930)
 Flachsmann the Educator (1930)
 Täter gesucht (1931)

Bibliography
 Jung, Uli & Schatzberg, Walter. Beyond Caligari: The Films of Robert Wiene. Berghahn Books, 1999.

References

External links

1894 births
1975 deaths
German film score composers
Male film score composers
German male composers
Musicians from Mulhouse
20th-century German composers
20th-century German male musicians